Union County High School is a secondary school located at 4464 US Highway 60 West just outside the city of Morganfield, Kentucky. It is part of the Union County Public Schools district located in Union County, Kentucky.  The school opened in 1964 following the consolidation of Morganfield, Sturgis and in 1967, Morganfield St Vincent. It now has approx. 700 students.

Academic performance

The school experienced its highest academic gain ever in the 2008-2009 round of KCCT testing; this set a record in the state for the Highest Academic Gain Ever.

Athletics
The Union County Braves and Bravettes compete in these sports:

Cross Country, Volleyball, Football, Wrestling, Basketball, Baseball, Softball, Soccer, Golf, Track & Tennis, & Archery.

State titles 
 Girls Basketball (1) – 
 1996
 Boys Track (3) – 
 1997, 1998, 1999
 Wrestling (13)

Notable people
 Dwane Casey - current head coach of the Detroit Pistons

References

External links
 Union County Public Schools
 Union County High School Twitter Page
 Union County High School Facebook Page

Public high schools in Kentucky
Schools in Union County, Kentucky
Morganfield, Kentucky
1964 establishments in Kentucky
Educational institutions established in 1964